This is a list of rectors of the University of Prague founded in 1347/1348 by Emperor Charles IV (the current official name is Charles University).

University of Prague 
 1366	Henricus de Etwat de Primislawia (Jindřich z Etwatu neboli z Embecku)
 1367	Henricus de Nanexen alias de Embeck (Jindřich z Nanexen neboli z Embecku)
 1372	Nicolaus Gewiczka seu de Kolberg (Mikuláš z Jevíčka neboli z Kolobřehu). In 1372, the Faculty of Law became an independent university.

1372–1419 University of 3 faculties 
 1373	Thomas de Busilia (Tomáš z Busilie)
 1374	Johannes Westphalis (Jan Vestfálský) Johannes Wenceslai de Praga (Jenek Václavův z Prahy)
 1375	Vigtholdus Westphalis de Praga (Witold Vestfálský z Prahy)
 1376–1377	Fridmanus de Praga (Fridman z Prahy)
 1378	Nicolaus de Gubin (Mikuláš z Gubyna), Hermannus de Wintersvick (Heřman z Winterswicku), Nicolaus Raconik (Mikuláš z Rakovníka)
 1382	Jenco de Praga (Johannes Wenceslai de Praga Jenek Václavův z Prahy)
 1383	Blasius Lupus (Blažej Vlk)
 1383–1384	Johannes Wenceslai de Praga (Jenek Václavův z Prahy), Heylmannus de Wormacia (Heilman z Wormsu) Johannes Papendorp (Jan Papendorf)
 1384–1385	Conradus Soltow (Konrád ze Soltau)
 1385	Nicolaus de Gubin (Mikuláš z Gubyna)
 1386	Nicolaus de Litomysl (Mikuláš z Litomyšle)
 1387	Nicolaus de Gubin (Mikuláš z Gubyna)
 1388–1389	Johannes Winkleri (Jan Winkler)
 1389	Bartholomeus Torghelowe (Bartoloměj Torghelow)
 1389–1390	Nicolaus Bochnik (Mikuláš Bochnik)
 1391–1392	Henricus de Bremis (Jindřich z Brém)
 1392	Henricus Reczekow de Rybenicze (Jindřich Reček z Rybenice)
 1392–1393	Albertus Engelschalk de Straubinga (Albert Engelschalk ze Straubingu)
 1393	Johannes Eliae (Jan Eliášův)
 1393–1394	Elias de Thin (Eliáš z Týna)
 1394	Henricus de Homberg (Jindřich z Homburgu)
 1394	Johannes de Moravia (Jan z Moravy)
 1394–1395	Petrus de Redino (Petr z Redina)
 1395–1396	Johannes de Mutha (Jan z Mýta)
 1396–1397	Henricus de Perching (Jindřich z Perchingu)
 1397	Nicolaus Magni de Jawor (Mikuláš Magni z Jawora)
 1397–1398	Stephanus de Colonia seu Colinensis (Štěpán z Kolína neboli Kolínský)
 1398	Johannes Ottonis de Monsterberg (Jan Otův ze Ziebice)
 1398–1399	Helmoldus de Soltwedel (Helmold ze Soltwedelu)
 1400	Stephanus de Palecz (Štěpán z Pálče)
 1401	Nicolaus Stor de Swydnicz (Mikuláš Stor ze Svídnice)
 1402–1403	Nicolaus de Lutomyssl (Mikuláš z Litomyšle)
 1403	Walterus Harrasser (Walter Harraser)
 1404	Stanislaus de Znoyma (Stanislav ze Znojma)
 1404–1405	Johannes de Pustimir (Jan z Pustiměře)
 1405	Christianus de Prachaticz (Křišťan z Prachatic)
 1405–1407	Clemens de Mnichovicz (Kliment z Mnichovic)
 1407	Andreas de Broda (Ondřej z Brodu)
 1407–1408	Bernhardus de Granovicz (Bernard z Granovice)
 1408	Clemens de Mnichov (Kliment z Mnichovic)
 1408	Zdenko de Labun (Zdeněk z Labouně), Marcus de Grecz (Marek z Hradce Králové)
 1408–1409	Henningus de Baltenhagen (Henning z Baltenhagenu)
 1409	Zdenko de Labun (Zdeněk z Labouně)
 1409–1410	Johannes Hus (Jan Hus), Johannes Hoffmanus Swidnicensis (Jan Hofman ze Svídnice)
 1410	Johannes Andreae (Jan Ondřejův řečený Šindel)
 1410–1411	Jacobus de Sobieslavia (Jakub Matějův ze Soběslavi), Gregorius de Praga (Jiří z Prahy), Johannes de Jessenicz (Jan z Jesenice), Gallus de Utery (Havel z Úterého)
 1411	Simon de Tisnov (Šimon z Tišnova)
 1412	Marcus de Grecz (Marek z Hradce Králové)
 1412–1413	Christianus de Prachaticz (Křišťan z Prachatic)
 1413	Michael de Malenicz (Michal z Malenic)
 1413–1414	Antonius de Luna (Antonín z Loun)
 1414	Gallus de Utery (Havel z Úterého), Briccius de Buda (Brikcius z Budína)
 1415	Briccius de Buda (Brikcius z Budína)
 1415–1416	Thomas de Lissa (Tomáš z Lysé) Simon de Rokiczana (Šimon z Rokycan)
 1416	Jacobus de Sobieslavia (Jakub ze Soběslavi)
 1416–1417	Johannes Cardinalis von Bergreichenstein (Jan Kardinál z Rejnštejna)
 1418	Zdislaus de Zwirzeticz (Zdislav ze Zvířetic)

1372–1419 Independent Law School 
 1372–1373	Johannes de Pernstein (Jan z Pernštejna); Gerhardus Visbeke de Osenbrughe (Gerhard Wisbeck z Osnabrücku) was a vicecektor
 1373–1375	Pertholdus de Wehingen (Berthold z Wehingenu)
 1375–1376	Johannes de Hohenloch (Jan z Hohenlohe), Eglolfus Hornbech – vicerektor (Eglolf Hornbeck)
 1376–1377	Gorlacus Horst de Stargardia (Gerlach Horst ze Stargardu)
 1377–1378	Johannes Slepekow (Jan Slepekow)
 1378–1379	Henricus de Stwolenca (Jindřich ze Stvolenky)
 1379–1380	Henricus de Stwolenca (Jindřich ze Stvolenky)
 1380–1381	Nicolaus de Kossczol (Mikuláš z Kosczola) Johannes Saxo de Zirberch – vicerektor (Jan Saxo ze Zirbergu) Nicolaus Wenceslai dictus Geunher de Praga – vicerektor (Mikuláš Václavův řečený Geunher z Prahy)
 1381–1382	Nicolaus Geunheri de Praga (Mikuláš Geunher z Prahy)
 1382–1383	Carolus Haguini (Karel Haguin)
 1383–1384	Georgius de Hohenloch (Jiří z Hohenlohe)
 1384–1385	Nicolaus Geunheri de Praga (Mikuláš Geunher z Prahy)
 1385–1386	Ulricus Medek de Schellemberg (Oldřich Medek ze Šelemberku)
 1386–1387	Mathias Kule (Matyáš Kule)
 1387–1388	Smylo de Wyncow (Jodocus Smylo de Kunstat Smil z Kunštátu)
 1388–1389	Nicolaus Geunheri de Praga (Mikuláš Geunher z Prahy)
 1389–1390	Jaroslaus de Porzessin (Jaroslav z Pořešína)
 1390–1391	Nicolaus Erghemes de Livonia (Mikuláš Erghemes z Livonska)
 1391–1392	Cristanus Aroldishusen (Kryštof z Freiburgu)
 1392–1393	Petrus Cappleri de Sulewicz (Petr Kaplíř ze Sulevic)
 1393–1394	Jodocus Hecht de Rossicz (Jošt Hecht z Rosic)
 1394	Johannes de Brun (Jan z Brunnu)
 1394–1395	Johannes Czeghenryd de Sundis (Jan Zeghenried ze Stralsundu)
 1395–1396	Czenko de Labun (Čeněk z Labouně)
 1396–1397	Lucas Hezler de Legnicz (Lukáš Hezler z Lehnice)
 1397–1398	Petrus Slewynk (Petr Slewynk)
 1398–1399	Nicolaus Geunheri (Mikuláš Geunher z Prahy)
 1399–1400	Nicolaus Geunheri (Mikuláš Geunher z Prahy)
 1400–1401	Stephanus de Manicz (Štěpán z Manic)
 1401	Mroczko de Kiszelewo dictus Nagorka (Mroczko z Kiszelewa řečený Nagorka), Nicolaus Geunheri – vicerektor (Mikuláš Geunher z Prahy)
 1401–1402	Nicolaus Geunheri (Mikuláš Geunher z Prahy)
 1402–1403	Heuke de Konyad (Hewko z Konyad)
 1403–1404	Nicolaus Geunheri (Mikuláš Geunher z Prahy)
 1404–1405	Johannes Pauli (Jan Paulův)
 1405–1406	Bernhardus Bulowe de Glyn (Bernhard Bulow z Glynu)
 1406–1407	Andreas Gerechini (Ondřej Gerechin)
 1407–1408	Ulricus de Glowaczow (Matyáš z Glowaczowa)
 1408–1409	Ulricus de Strassicz (Oldřich ze Strašic)
 1409–1410	Ulricus de Strassitz (Oldřich ze Strašic)
 1410–1411	Mathias de Trutenow (Matyáš z Trutenowa)
 1411–1412	Henricus Rolle (Jindřich Rolle)
 1412–1413	Conradus Wertheim (Konrád Wertheim)
 1413–1415	Mathias Rost de Praga (Matyáš Rost z Prahy)
 1415–1416	Arnestus de Metelsko (Arnošt z Metelska)
 1416–1418	Ulricus de Strassitz (Oldřich ze Strašic)
 1418–1419	Nicolaus Henrici de Praga (Mikuláš Jindřichův z Prahy)

1419–1622 Utraquist Academy (Carolinum) 
 1420	Martinus Cunssonis de Praga (Martin Kunšův z Prahy)
 1420–1421	Procopius de Plzna (Prokop z Plzně)
 1425	Petrus de Sepekov (Petr ze Sepekova)
 1425–1426	Johannes Borotin (Jan z Borotína)
 1426	Procopius de Plzna (Prokop z Plzně)
 1434	Christianus de Prachaticz (Křištan z Prachatic)
 1435  John of Rokycan
 1437	Christianus de Prachaticz (Křištan z Prachatic)
 1438–1439	Petrus de Mladoniovicz (Petr z Mladoňovic)
 1439–1440	Wenceslaus de Prachaticz (Václav z Prachatic)
 1440–1441	Augustinus de Glatovia (Augustin z Klatov)
 1442–1443	Petrus de Grecz (Petr z Hradce Králové)
 1443–1444	Procopius de Plzna (Prokop z Plzně)
 1444	Wenceslaus de Prachaticz (Václav z Prachatic)
 1445	Johannes de Sobieslavia (Jan ze Soběslavi)
 1447–1448	Mauricius de Benessow (Mařík z Benešova)
 1449–1450	Petrus de Grecz (Petr z Hradce Králové)
 1450–1451	Johannes de Czaslaw (Jan z Čáslavi)
 1453–1454	Wenceslaus de Prachaticz (Václav z Prachatic)
 1455–1456	Martinus de Lancicia (Martin z Lančic)
 1456–1457	Stanislaus de Welwar (Stanislav z Velvar)
 1457–1458	Johannes de Jemnicz (Jan z Jemnice)
 1459–1460	Wenceslaus de Wrben (Václav z Vrbna)
 1460–1462	Johannes de Praga (Jan z Prahy)
 1462–1463	Wenceslaus Coranda de Plzna (Václav Koranda z Plzně)
 1463–1464	Johannes de Czaslaw (Jan z Čáslavi)
 1464–1465	Paulus de Dobrin (Pavel z Dobřína)
 1466–1467	Wenceslaus de Wrben (Václav z Vrbna)
 1467–1469	Johannes de Praga (Jan z Prahy)
 1470–1471	Wenceslaus Coranda de Plzna (Václav Koranda z Plzně)
 1471–1472	Jacobus de Patzau (Jakub z Pacova)
 1474–1475	Johannes de Tabor (Jan z Tábora)
 1476–1477	Gregorius Pragensis (Řehoř z Prahy)
 1477–1479	Laurencius de Rokycan (Vavřinec z Rokycan)
 1480–1481	Wenceslaus de Trzepsko (Václav z Třebska)
 1483–1484	Jacobus de Patzau (Jakub z Pacova)
 1484–1485	Paulus de Zaacz (Pavel ze Žatce)
 1487–1488	Johannes Pragensis (Jan z Prahy)
 1492–1493	Paulus de Zaacz (Pavel ze Žatce)
 1494–1496	Jacobus de Strziebro Strziebrensis (Jakub ze Stříbra)
 1496–1497	Paulus de Zaacz (Pavel ze Žatce)
 1498–1499	Martinus de Wlassim (Martin z Vlašimi)
 1499–1500	Wenceslaus de Pacow (Václav z Pacova)
 1502–1503	Georgius Kaurzimensis (Jiří z Kouřimi)
 1504–1505	Jacobus Pacowiensis (Jakub z Pacova)
 1505	Wenceslaus de Pacow (Václav z Pacova)
 1508–1509	Michael de Straz (Michal ze Stráže)
 1509–1510	Wenceslaus de Pacow (Václav z Pacova)
 1511–1512	Wenceslaus Candidus (Václav Candidus)
 1512–1513	Wenceslaus de Pacow (Václav z Pacova)
 1513	Wenceslaus Coranda de Plzna (Václav Koranda z Plzně)
 1514–1515	Wenceslaus Letomyslius (Václav z Litomyšle)
 1515–1516	Duchco Brodensius (Duchek z Brodu)
 1516–1517	Wenceslaus Letomyslius (Václav z Litomyšle)
 1517–1519	Laurentius Trebonius (Vavřinec z Třeboně)
 1519–1521	Wenceslaus Letomyslius (Václav z Litomyšle)
 1521–1522	Johannes Presticenus (Jan z Přeštic)
 1522–1523	Wenceslaus Letomyslius (Václav z Litomyšle), prorector Johannes Presticenus (Jan z Přeštic)
 1524–1525	Johannes Presticenus (Jan z Přeštic)
 1525–1526	Thomas Wlassymensis (Tomáš z Vlašimi)
 1526–1527	Mathias Chorambius (Matyáš Koramba)
 1527–1528	Thomas Rakonus (Tomáš Rakovnický)
 1528–1530	Johannes Presticenus (Jan z Přeštic)
 1530–1531	Laurentius Trebonius (Vavřinec z Třeboně)
 1531–1532	Johannes Presticenus de Jaworzicz (Jan Přeštický z Javořice)
 1532–1533	Georgius Piesensis (Jiří Písecký)
 1533–1535	Johannes Chocenus (Jan Choceňský)
 1535–1536	Georgius Pisensis (Jiří Písecký)
 1537–1538	Johannes Hortensius Pragensis (Jan Zahrádka z Prahy)
 1538–1539	Martinus Glatovinus Bethlemiticus (Martin Klatovský z Betléma)
 1539–1540	Johannes Hortensius Pragensis (Jan Zahrádka z Prahy)
 1540–1541	Georgius Pisensis (Jiří Písecký)
 1541–1542	Martinus Glatovinus Bethlemiticus (Martin Klatovský z Betléma)
 1542–1545	Henricus Curius de Helfenberg (Jindřich Dvorský z Helfenberka)
 1545–1546	Johannes Hortensius Prahenus (Jan Zahrádka z Prahy)
 1546–1548	Gregorius Orinus de Chocemicz (Řehoř Orinus z Chocemic)
 1548–1551	Johannes Hortensius Prahenus (Jan Zahrádka z Prahy)
 1551–1553	Sebastianus Aerichalcus Praesticenus (Šebestián Aerichalcus z Přeštic)

 1553–1557	Johannes Hortensius Pragenus (Jan Zahrádka z Prahy)
 1557–1559	Johannes Colonius (Jan Kolínský)
 1559–1561	Mathias Dapsilius Curius ab Hajek (Matyáš Dvorský z Hájku)
 1561–1562	Georgius Polenta a Sudetis (Jiří Polenta ze Sudetu)
 1562–1572	Mathias Curius ab Hajek (Matyáš Dvorský z Hájku)
 1572–1573	Petrus Codicillus de Tulechowa (Petr Kodicill z Tulechova)
 1573–1582	Mathias Curius ab Hajek (Matyáš Dvorský z Hájku)
 1582–1589	Petrus Codicillus de Tulechow (Petr Kodicill z Tulechova)
 1589–1591	Marcus Bydzovinus a Florentino (Marek Bydžovský z Florentýna)
 1591–1593	Trojanus Nigellus de Osskorzina (Trojan Nigellus z Oskořína)
 1593–1594	Adamus Zaluzanius de Zaluzan (Adam Zalužanský ze Zalužan)
 1594–1597	Marcus Bydžovinus a Florentino (Marek Bydžovský z Florentýna)
 1597–1599	Trojanus Nigellus de Osskorzina (Trojan Nigellus z Oskořína)
 1599–1600	Martinus Bachaczii de Naumierzicz (Martin Bacháček z Nauměřic)
 1600–1602	Johannes Adam Bystrziczenus (Jan Adam z Bystřice)
 1602–1603	Marcus Bydžovinus a Florentino (Marek Bydžovský z Florentýna)
 1603–1612	Martinus Bachacius de Naumierzicz (Martin Bacháček z Nauměřic)
 1612	Johannes Campanus Wodnianus (Jan Kampanus Vodňanský)
 1612–1613	Adamus Huber de Risenpach (Adam Huber z Riesenbachu)
 1613–1614	Julius Schlick (Julius Šlik)
 1614–1615	Johannes Albrechtus Krzinetius de Ronow (Jan Albrecht Křinecký z Ronova)
 1615–1616	Johannes Abraham a Gerstorf (Jan Abraham z Gersdorfu)
 1616–1617	Johannes Christophorus a Fiinfkirchen (Jan Kryštof z Pětikostelí)
 1617	Stephanus Strelius de Rencer (Štěpán Střela z Rokyc)
 1617–1620	Jan Jesenius
 1620–1621	Carolus Hilprand de Walterskirchen (Karel Hilprandt z Walterskirchenu), Johannes Campanus Wodnianus – prorektor (Jan Kampanus Vodňanský)
 1621	Johannes Campanus Wodnianus (Jan Kampanus Vodňanský)
 1621–1622	Nicolaus Troilus Hagiochoranus (Mikuláš Troilus Hagiochoranus)

1556–1654 Jesuit Ferdinand's Academy (Clementinum) 
 1556–1558	Ursmarus Goisonius (Ursmar de Goisson)
 1558–1561	Paulus Hoffaeus (Pavel Hoffae)
 1561–1574	Henricus Blissemius (Jindřich Blyssem)
 1574–1580	Joannes Paulus Campanus (Jan Pavel Campani)
 1582–1589	Alexander Voit (Alexander Voit) – 1580	vicerektor 1581	prorector
 1589–1590	Joannes Reinelius (Jan Reinel)
 1590–1591	Paulus Neukirchius (Pavel Neukirche)
 1591–1592	Alexander Voit (Alexander Voit)
 1593–1595	Wenceslaus Sturmius (Václav Šturm)
 1595–1601	Melchiorus Trevinnius (Melchior Trevino)
 1601–1606	Jacobus Geranus (Jakub Geranus)
 1606–1610	Theophilus Christecus (Theofyl Krystecki Krysztek)
 1610–1616	Jacobus Geranus (Jakub Geranus)

1622–1638 Common rectors of Carolinum and Clementinum 
 1622–1623	Valentinus Coronius (Valentin Koruna)
 1623–1626	Petr Jimenéz (Ximenius)
 1626–1629	Martin Santinus
 1629–1638	Martin Středa (Stedonius)

1638–1654 Jesuit Ferdinand's University (Clementinum) 
In 1638–1654, Carolinum had no rector.

 1638–1639	Jiří Meridies
 1639–1643	Blažej Slanina
 1643–1646	Pavel Anastasius
 1646–1650	Ondřej du Buisson
 1650–1652	Jiří Molitoris
 1652–1653	Jiří Hogenegger (1616–1684), vice-rector
 1653–1654	Jan Molitoris

1654–1881 Charles-Ferdinand University 
In 1654	both universities were unified.

 1654	Jan Molitoris	
 1655	Jindřich Pipius
 1655	Mikuláš Franchimont z Franckensfeldu
 1655–1659	Ondřej Schambogen
 1660	Kryštof Norbert Knauth z Fahnenschwungu
 1661	Jan z Vrbna
 1662	Jan Marcus Marci z Kronlandu
 1663	Jan z Vrbna
 1664	Kryštof Kyblín z Waffenburku
 1665	Jan Saxius
 1666	Mikuláš Franchimont z Franckenfeldu
 1667	Václav Zímmerman
 1668	Ignác František Tam
 1669	Šimon Schürer
 1670–1671	Jakub Jan Václav Dobřenský de Nigro Ponte
 1672	Daniel Krupský
 1673	Jan Jiří Funck
 1674	Matyáš Tanner
 1675–1676	Jan Jiří Proxa
 1677	Řehoř Král
 1678	Matyáš Alois Malanotte
 1679	Jiří Weis
 1680–1681	Šebestián Kristián Zeidler z Zeidlernu
 1682	Jan Wald
 1683	Jan Jiří Funck
 1684	František z Vrtby
 1685–1686	Jakub Jan Václav Dobřenský de Nigro Ponte
 1687	Emanuel de Boye
 1688	Jan Kryštof Schambogen
 1689	Václav Sattenwolf
 1690	Jan Jindřich Proxa
 1691	Václav Sattenwolf
 1692	Jan Kryštof Schambogen
 1693	Ondřej Muntzer
 1694	Jan Antonín Cassinis de Bugella
 1695	Jan Dubský
 1696–1697	Jan Jindřich Turba
 1698	Ferdinand Rudolf Waldhauser
 1699	Jan František Löw z Erlsfeldu
 1700	Kašpar Knittel
 1701	Jan Jindřich Turba
 1702	Tomáš Schmidl
 1703	Jan František Löw z Erlsfeldu
 1704	Jáchym Stechau
 1705	Jan Kašpar Ignác Wolwert de Neffe
 1706	Jiří Kinský (Chsinsky)
 1707	Jan Kašpar Ignác Voigt
 1708	Jan Miller
 1709–1710	Václav Jan z Kriegelsteinu
 1711	Jan Miller
 1712	Jan Frantíšek Löw z Erlsfeldu
 1713	Jakub Stessl
 1714–1715	Václav Xaver Neumann z Puchholtze
 1716	František Fragstein
 1717	Jan František Lbw z Erlsfeldu
 1718–1719	Heřman Oppersdorf
 1720	Jan Adam Besnecker
 1721	Jakub Stessl
 1722	Leonard Ferdinand Meisner
 1723	Franz Retz
 1724	Václav Xaver Neumann z Puchholtze
 1725–1726	Jan Nonnert
 1727	Ferdinand Leonard Meisner
 1728	Jan Seidel
 1729	Václav Xaver Neumann z Puchholtze
 1730–1731	Julius Zwicker
 1732	Ferdinand Leonard Meisner
 1733	Jan Seidel
 1734	Václav Xaver Neumann z Puchholtze
 1735	Jan Seidel
 1736	Jan Jakub Gelhausen vicerektor Václav Xaver
 1737	Václav Xaver Neumann z Puchholtze
 1738	Jan Heilman
 1739–1740	Václav Xaver Neumann z Puchholtze
 1741–1742	Jiří Peter
 1744	Jakub Smith z Balroe
 1745	František Xaver Heissler
 1746	Jindřich Petr Proichhausen
 1747	Leopold Grimm
 1748	Antonín Václav Rings
 1749	Leopold Grimm
 1750	Mikuláš Ignác Knigsmann
 1751	Bernard Weber
 1752	Jan Ignác Mayer z Mayersbachu
 1753	Bernard Weber
 1754	Josef Azzoni
 1755–1756	Baltazar Lindner
 1757	Jan Antonín Scrinci
 1758	Jan Tille
 1759	Jan Nepomuk Václav Dvořák z Boru
 1760	Jan Tille; from 17 June 1760	Jan Antonín Scrinci
 1761	Jan Antonín Scrinci
 1762	Jan Matyáš Schweiberer
 1763–1674	Ignác Kajetán Veit
 1765–1676	František Xaver Wissinger
 1767	František Du Toy
 1768	Jáchym Pleiner
 1769	František Václav Štěpán z Kronefelsu
 1770–1771	Petr Janovka
 1772–1773	František Wissinger (He died on 29	July, 1772	in Rome, the last Jesuit rector)
 1774	František Václav Stephan
 1775–1776	Pavel Seddeler
 1777	František Du Toy
 1778	Antonín František Veselý
 1779	Ferdinand Woldřich
 1780–1781	Tomáš Jan Hrdlička
 1782	Leonard Antonín Verbeck
 1783–1784	Karel Jindřich Seibt
 1785	Josef Antonín Schuster
 1786	Cosmas Schmalfus
 1787	Tadeáš Bayer
 1788	Jan Diesbach
 1789	Ferdinand Woldřich
 1790	Karel Rafael Ungar
 1791	Václav Vojtěch Forsat
 1892	Jan Diesbach
 1793	Josef z Bretfeldu
 1794	Jiljí Chládek
 1795	Jan Křitel Zauschner
 1796	Antonín Strnad
 1797	Josef z Bretfeldu
 1798	Kašpar Royko
 1799	Josef Bohumír Mikan
 1800	Stanislav Vydra
 1801	Jan Nepomuk Vignet
 1802	Vavřinec Chrysostomus Rogner
 1803	Antonín Michelič
 1804	Jan Goskho ze Sachsenthalu
 1805	Josef z Bretfeldu
 1806	František Xaver Hain
 1807	Ignác Matuschka
 1808	Václev Lenhart
 1809	Josef z Bretfeldu
 1810	Karel František Fischer
 1811	Josef Rottenberger
 1812	Milo Jan Nepomuk Grün
 1813	Josef z Bretfeldu na Kronenburgu
 1814–1815	František Pitroff
 1816	Alois Martin David
 1817	Josef z Bretfeldu na Kronenburgu
 1818	Karel František Fischer
 1819	Josef Rottenberger
 1820	František Mikuláš Titze
 1821	Michael Schuster
 1822	František Seraf Wilhelm
 1823	Ignác Nádherný
 1824	Josef Antonín Köhler
 1825	Martin Adolf Kopetz
 1826	Benedikt Jan Nepomuk Eiffer
 1827	Jan Theobald Held
 1828	Josef Ladislav Jandera
 1829	Jan Kaňka
 1830	František Tippmann
 1831	Julius Vincenz von Krombholz
 1832	Franz Ignatz Cassian Hallaschka (František Ignác Kassián Halaška)
 1833	Tomáš Karel Härdtl
 1834	Maxmilián Millauer
 1835	František Wünsch
 1836	Josef Leonard Knoll
 1837	Karel Václav Wolfram
 1838	Václav Vilém Václavíček
 1839	Antonín Jan Jungmann
 1840	Josef Jungmann
 1841	Antonín Karel Mudroch
 1842	Mikuláš Tomek
 1843	Jan Nepomuk Fischer
 1844	Jeroným Josef Zeidler
 1845	Leopold Hasner von Artha
 1846	Jeroným Josef Zeidler
 1847–1848	Josef Reisich
 1849	Josef Hoffmeister
 1850	František Serafin Češík
 1850–1851	Matyáš Popel
 1851–1852	Vincenc František Kostelecký
 1852–1853	Jiří Norbert Schnabel
 1853–1854	Jan Nep. Ignác Rotter
 1854–1855	Franz von Pitha
 1855–1856	Jeroným Josef Teidler
 1856–1857	Jan Chlupp
 1857–1858	Gabriel Güntner
 1858–1859	Anton von Jaksch
 1859–1860	August Emanuel von Reuss
 1860–1861	František Eduard Tuna
 1861–1862	Jan Křitel Smutek
 1862–1863	Josef von Löschner
 1863–1864	Jan Jindřich Löwe
 1864–1865	František Xaver Schneider
 1865–1866	Vincenc Náhlovský
 1866–1867	Josef Halla
 1867–1868	Vincenc František
 1868–1869	Jan Bedřich Schulte
 1869–1870	Eduard Petr
 1870–1871	Emanuel Seidl
 1871–1872	Konstantin von Höfler
 1872–1873	Jan Nepomuk Schier
 1873–1874	František Antonín Mayer
 1874–1875	Joseph Hasner
 1875–1876	Samuel Friedrich Stein
 1876–1877	Karl von Czyhlarz
 1877–1878	Antonín Reinwarth
 1878–1879	Jan Streng
 1879–1880	Ernst Mach
 1880–1881	Huga Kremer–Auenrode
 1881–1882	Josef Schindler

1882–1939 Czech University 
 1882–1883	Václav Vladivoj Tomek
 1883–1884	Antonín Randa
 1884–1885	Jan Streng
 1885–1886	Václav Tomek
 1886–1887	Emil Ott
 1888–1889	František Studnička
 1889–1890	Matouš Talíř
 1890–1891	Vladimír Tomsa
 1891–1892	Antonín Frič
 1892–1893	Jiří Pražák
 1893–1894	Frantšek X. Kryštůfek
 1894–1895	Arnold Spina
 1895–1896	Karel Vrba
 1896–1897	Jaromír Hanel
 1897–1898	Eugen Kadeřávek
 1898–1899	Josef Reinsberg
 1889–1900	Jan Gebauer
 1900–1901	Josef Strupecký
 1901–1902	Jan Ladislav Sýkora
 1902–1903	Ivan Horbaczewski
 1903–1904	Čeněk Strouhal
 1904–1905	František Stroch
 1905–1906	Antonín Vřešťál
 1906–1907	Jaroslav Hlava
 1907–1908	Lubor Niederle
 1908–1909	Leopold Heyrovský
 1909–1910	Josef Král
 1910–1911	Jan Jánošík
 1911–1912	Jaromír Čelákovský
 1912–1913	František Vejdovský
 1913–1914	František Mareš
 1914–1915	Kamil Henner
 1915–1916	Rudolf Dvořák
 1916–1917	Vítězslav Janovský
 1917–1918	Gabriel Pecháček
 1918–1919	Karel Hermann–Otavský
 1919–1920	Josef Zubatý
 1920–1921	František Mareš
 1921–1922	Bohumil Němec
 1922–1923	Cyril Horáček
 1923–1924	František Pastrnek
 1924–1925	Otakar Kukula
 1925–1926	Karel Petr
 1926–1927	Josef Vančura
 1927–1928     Lubor Niederle
 1928–1929	Vladimír Slavík
 1929–1930	Jindřich Matiegka
 1930–1931	August Miřička
 1931–1932	Josef Pekař
 1932–1933	Rudolf Kimla
 1933–1934	Karel Domin
 1934–1935	Josef Drachovský
 1935–1936	Gustav Friedrich
 1936–1937	Karel Weigner
 1937–1938	František Slavík
 1938–1939	Vilém Funk
 1939–1940	Bedřich Hrozný

1882–1945 German University 
 1882–1883 Ewald Hering
 1883–1884 Ernst Mach, replaced by Ferdinand Lippich
 1884–1885 Friedrich Rulf
 1885–1886 Wenzel Frind
 1886–1887 Carl Gussenbauer
 1887–1888 Moritz Willkomm
 1888–1889 Dominik Ullmann
 1889/1890 Josef Sprinzl
 1890/1891 Philipp Knoll
 1891/1892 Johann von Kelle
 1892/1893 Emil Sax
 1893/1894 Gustav Carl Laube
 1894/1895 Josef Schindler
 1895/1896 Karl Hugo Huppert
 1896/1897 Anton Marty
 1897/1898 Joseph Ulbrich	
 1898–1899 Anton Kurz
 1899/1900 Carl Holzinger Ritter von Weidich 	
 1900/1901 Hans Chiari
 1901/1902 Friedrich Freiherr von Wieser	
 1902/1902 Adolf Bachmann	
 1903/1904 Carl Rabl, elected rector Virgil Grimmich died on 13 August 1903
 1904/1905 Alois Rzach
 1905/1906 Josef Rieber
 1906/1907 Emil Pfersche
 1907/1908 August Sauer	
 1908/1909 Rudolf von Jaksch
 1909/1910 Josef Zaus	
 1910/1911 Max Grünert	
 1911/1912 Heinrich Rauchberg	
 1912/1913 Robert Lendlmayr Ritter von Lendenfeld, died on 3 June 1913
 1913/1914 Richard Ritter von Zeynek, 1869–1945
 1914/1915 Heinrich Swoboda	
 1915/1916 Adolf Zycha
 1916/1917 Ottokar Weber
 1917/1918 Anton Elschnig	
 1918–1920 August Naegle
 1920/1921 Franz Wähner	
 1921/1922 Robert Mayr-Harting	
 1922/1923 Samuel Steinherz	
 1923/1924 Karl Kreibich
 1924/1925 Josef Jatsch
 1925/1926 Carl Isidor Cori
 1926/1927 Otto Peterka
 1927/1928 Carl Isidor Cori
 1928/1929 Otto Grosser
 1929/1930 August Naegle
 1930/1931 Carl Isidor Cori
 1931–1933 Mariano San Nicolò
 1933/1934 Gerhard Gesemann
 1934/1935 Otto Grosser
 1935/1936 Karl Hilgenreiner
 1936/1937 Michael Stark
 1937/1938 Rudolf Schránil	
 1938/1939 Ernst Otto
 1939/1940 Ernst Otto
 1940–1942 Wilhelm Saure
 1942/1943 Alfred Buntru
 1943/1944 Friedrich Klausing
 1944/1945 Kurt Albrecht

1945–present Charles University 
 1945–1946	Jan Bělehrádek
 1946–1947	Bohumil Bydžovský
 1947–1948	Karel Engliš
 1948–1954	Jan Mukařovský
 1954–1958	Miroslav Katětov
 1958–1966	Jaroslav Procházka
 1966–1969	Oldřich Starý
 1969–1970	Josef Charvát
 1970–1976	Bedřich Švestka
 1976–1990	Zdeněk Češka
 1990–1995	Radim Palouš
 1995–1999	Karel Malý
 1999–2005	Ivan Wilhelm
 2005-2014	Václav Hampl
 2014–2022 Tomáš Zima
 2022–present Milena Králíčková

References

External links 
 Česká politika 
 Karl-Ferdinands-Universität Prag